Jacky Meindu (born 6 June 1989) is a New Caledonian footballer who plays as a midfielder for Sud Nivernais Imphy Decize in the French Division d'Honneur.

He signed for the French club from USC Nouméa in New Caledonia in November 2016.

References

1989 births
Living people
New Caledonian footballers
Association football midfielders
New Caledonia international footballers
2016 OFC Nations Cup players